The West Branch Unadilla River is a river in the state of New York. It flows into the Unadilla River near Unadilla Forks, New York. This branch was known as Eghwagy Creek during the early 18th century.

References

Rivers of New York (state)
Rivers of Otsego County, New York
Rivers of Madison County, New York
Rivers of Oneida County, New York